Ankles Preferred is a 1927 American silent comedy film directed by John G. Blystone and written by James Shelley Hamilton. The film stars Madge Bellamy, Lawrence Gray, Barry Norton, Allan Forrest, Marjorie Beebe and Joyce Compton. The film was released on February 27, 1927, by Fox Film Corporation.

Cast
Madge Bellamy as Nora
Lawrence Gray as Barney
Barry Norton as Jimmy
Allan Forrest as Hornsbee
Marjorie Beebe as Flo
Joyce Compton as Virginia
Lillian Elliott as Mrs. Goldberg
Mary Foy as Mrs. McGuire
J. Farrell MacDonald as McGuire
William H. Strauss as Mr. Goldberg

References

External links 
 

1927 films
1920s English-language films
Fox Film films
Silent American comedy films
1927 comedy films
Films directed by John G. Blystone
American black-and-white films
American silent feature films
1920s American films